Bishops of the (Breslau )Wrocław Bishopric, Prince-Bishopric (1290–1918), and Archdiocese (since 1930; see Roman Catholic Archdiocese of Wrocław for details).

Bishops
 1000–? – John (Johannes)
 1051–1062 – Hieronymus
 1063–1072 – John I
 1074–1111 – Piotr I
 1112–1120 – Żyrosław I
 1120–1126 – Haymo
 1127–1140 – Robert I
 1140–1142 – Robert II
 1145–1146 – Konrad
 1146–1149 – Jan
 1149–1169 – Walter
 1170–1198 – Siroslaus II
 1198–1201 – Jarosław, Duke of Opole (Jaroslaw of Opole)
 1201–1207 – Cyprian, (1196–1201 Bishop of Lebus)
 1207–1232 – Wawrzyniec
 1232–1268 – Tomasz I
1268–1270 – Ladislaus of Salzburg, administrator
 1270–1290 – Thomas II.

Prince-Bishops
1290–1292 – Thomas II, granted princely regalia by Henry IV Probus for the episcopal Duchy of Nysa and Castellany of Otmuchów on 23 June 1290
1292–1301 – Johann III Romka
1302–1319 – Henry of Wierzbna (Heinrich von Würben)
1319–1326 – sede vacante after double election:
Vitus of Habdank;
Lutold of Kroměříž
1319–1326 – Nikolaus of Banz, administrator due to sede vacante
1326–1341 – Nanker (Nankier Kołda), bishop of Cracow (1320–1326)
1342–1376 – Przecław of Pogorzela
1376–1382 – sede vacante due to double election:
Dietrich of Klatovy 1376, verified 1378 by Avignon Pope Clemens VII;
Johann von Neumarkt (Johannes Noviforensis) 1380, verified by Roman Pope Urban VI, died before taking office
1381–1382 – Wenceslaus, Duke of Legnica, administrator due to sede vacante
1382–1417 – Wenceslaus II of Legnica, 1417 resignation
1417–1447 – Konrad IV the Older
1447–1456 – Peter II Nowak
1456–1467 – Jošt of Rožmberk
1468–1482 – Rudolf of Rüdesheim
1482–1506 – Johann IV Roth
1506–1520 – John V Thurzó
1520–1539 – Jakob of Salza
1539–1562 – Balthasar of Promnitz
1562–1574 – Kaspar of Logau
1574–1585 – Martin of Gerstmann
1585–1596 – Andreas of Jerin
1596–1599 – Bonaventura Hahn, 1596 annulled by emperor, 1599 forced to resign by pope
1599–1600 – Paul Albert von Radolfzell
1600–1608 – Johann VI of Sitsch
1608–1624 – Archduke Charles Joseph of Inner Austria
1625–1655 – Prince Charles Ferdinand Vasa
1635–1655 – Johann Balthasar Liesch von Hornau, administrator, because Karl Ferdinand Wasa did not reside in Breslau
1656–1662 – Archduke Leopold Wilhelm of Austria
1663–1664 – Archduke Charles Joseph of Austria
1665–1671 – Sebastian von Rostock
1671–1682 – Friedrich von Hessen-Darmstadt
1682–1683 – Karl von Liechtenstein, resignation by papal order
1683 + Wolfgang Georg von Pfalz-Neuburg, had died before election
1683–1732 – Count Palatine Francis Louis of Neuburg
1732–1747 – Philipp Ludwig von Sinzendorf
1748–1795 – Philipp Gotthard von Schaffgotsch, since 1744 coadjutor
1757–1781 – Johann Moritz von Strachwitz, administrator of Prussian part, since 1761 auxiliary bishop
1781–1795 – Anton Ferdinand von Rothkirch und Panthen, administrator of Prussian part, since 1781 Auxiliary bishop
1795–1817 – Joseph Christian Franz zu Hohenlohe-Waldenburg-Bartenstein, 1787 coadjutor of Prussian part
1817–1824 – sede vacante with Emanuel von Schimonsky as capitular vicar and apostolic administrator
1824–1832 – Emanuel von Schimonsky
1832–1836 – sede vacante with Leopold von Sedlnitzky as capitular vicar
1836–1840 – Leopold von Sedlnitzky, resignation, later convert to Protestantism
1840–1843 – sede vacante with Ignaz Ritter as capitular vicar
1843–1844 – Joseph Knauer, elect 1841, Grand Dean of the County of Kladsko between 1809–1843
1844–1845 – sede vacante with Daniel Latussek as capitular vicar, since 1838 auxiliary bishop
1845–1853 – Melchior Freiherr von Diepenbrock, Cardinal
1853–1881 – Heinrich Förster
1881–1882 – sede vacante with Hermann Gleich as capitular vicar, since 1875 auxiliary bishop
1882–1886 – Robert Herzog, Prince-Episcopal Delegate for Brandenburg and Pomerania (1870–1882)
1886–1887 – sede vacante Hermann Gleich as capitular vicar
1887–1914 – Georg von Kopp, Cardinal
1914–1930 – Adolf Bertram, Cardinal since 1916 (public announcement 1919), title of prince-bishop voided in 1918 (but he continued to use  the princely title until his death).

Archbishops
1930–1945 – Adolf Bertram (d. 6 July 1945), Cardinal since 1916 (public announcement 1919), archbishop since 13 August 1930
1945–1972 – sede vacante
Intermittent administrators and capitular vicars: 
16 July 1945 till 31 August 1945 – Capitular vicar Ferdinand Piontek, bishop-elect
Breslau and most of the archdiocesan territory (like most of Silesia) were annexed to the People's Republic of Poland in July 1945. On 1 September 1945 the archdiocese was de facto divided into four separate areas, (1) the East German archdiocesan area (seat in Görlitz), (2) the administrative district of Gorzów Wielkopolski (also competent for the Polish-annexed diocesan areas of the archepiscopal suffragans, such as the Diocese of Berlin and the Territorial Prelature of Schneidemühl), (3) the administrative district of Opole, and (4) the administrative district of Wrocław (until 1978 also competent for the Czechoslovakian archdiocesan area):
 (1) 1945–1963 Capitular Vicar Ferdinand Piontek (1878–1963), in the East German archdiocesan area he remained undisputedly in office since his election on 16 July 1945, Pope Pius XII granted him on 28 February 1946, when still residing in Wrocław, the rights of a residing bishop. Piontek was expelled from Poland to the British zone of occupation on 9 July, he could return to the archdiocese in March 1947, then taking residence in East German Görlitz.
 (1) 1963–1972 Capitular Vicar Gerhard Schaffran, also Bishop of Meissen (1970–1987)
 (2) 1945–1951 Administrator Edmund Nowicki, appointed for the Gorzów Wielkopolski district with effect of 1 September 1945, deposed and expelled by Communist Polish government on 26 January 1951
 (2) 1951–1952 Capitular Vicar Tadeusz Załuczkowski
 (2) 1952–1955 Capitular Vicar Zygmunt Szelążek
 (2) 1956–1958 Capitular Vicar Teodor Bensch
 (2) 1958–1958 Capitular Vicar Józef Michalski
 (2) 1958–1972 Capitular Vicar Wilhelm Pluta, thereafter bishop of the Diocese of Gorzów Wielkopolski newly established from the archdiocese in 1972
 (3) 1945–1951 Administrator Bolesław Kominek, appointed administrator for the Opole district with effect of 1 September 1945, deposed and expelled by Communist Polish government on 26 January 1951
 (3) 1951–1956 Capitular Vicar Emil Kobierzycki
 (3) 1956–1972 Franciszek Jop, Special Delegate (for Opole) of Primas Stefan Wyszyński, administrator since 1967, thereafter bishop of the Diocese of Opole newly established from the archdiocese in 1972
 (4) 1945–1951 Administrator Karol Milik, appointed for the Wrocław district by August Hlond on 15 August with effect of 1 September 1945, not recognized as archbishop by the Holy See, deposed and expelled by Communist Polish government on 26 January 1951
 (4) 1951–1956 – Capitular Vicar Kazimierz Lagosz, not recognized as archbishop by the Holy See
 (4) 1956–1972 – Capitular Vicar Bolesław Kominek, not recognized as archbishop by the Holy See, thereafter appointed as archbishop of Wrocław with a sharply belittled archdiocesan area
 (2, 3 and 4) 1951–1958 – Teodor Bensch, spiritual assistant with episcopal jurisdiction for the remaining non-expelled Germans in the Polish part of the archdiocese (residing in Gorzów Wielkopolski (Landsberg an der Warthe)).
In 1972 the Holy See redrew the archdiocesan boundaries. The East German archdiocesan area (1) was disentangled from the archdiocese and established as the exempt Apostolic Administration of Görlitz (in 1994 elevated to diocese), the district of Gorzów Wielkopolski was established as the new archepiscopal suffragan Diocese of Gorzów Wielkopolski (renamed and regrouped as suffragan in 1992), the district of Opole (3) was established as the new suffragan Diocese of Opole and the territorially belittled remainder henceforth became the archdiocese proper with its capitular vicar elevated to archbishop.
1972–1974 – Bolesław Kominek, card., papally appointed as archbishop
1974–1976 – sede vacante with Wincenty Urban as capitular vicar
1976–2004 – Henryk Gulbinowicz, card.
2004–2013 – Marian Gołębiewski
since 2013 – Józef Kupny

Auxiliary bishops
1251–1260 – Wit
1268 – Salwiusz
1270 – Herbord
1294 – Iwan
1302 – Paweł
1303 – Mikołaj
1303 – Hartung
1307–1323 – Paweł
1339–1345 – Stefan
1346–1365 – Franciszek Rothwitz
1352–1378 – Tomasz
1355–1370 – Maciej
1365–1398 – Dersław
1390–1411 – Mikołaj
1410–1431 – Tyleman Wessel
1405–1435 – Bernard
1331–1446 – Jan Panwitz
1447–1453 – Bernard
1456–1461 – Jan Pelletz
1432–1470 – Jan Erler
1455–1457 – Franciszek Kuhschmalz
1476–1504 – Jan
1505–1538 – Heinrich Füllstein
1539–1545 – Johann Thiel
1577–1605 – Adam Weisskopf
1604–1613 – Georg Skultetus
1614–1615 – Franz Ursinus
1617–1624 – Martin Kolsdorf
1625–1661 – Johann Balthasar Liesch von Hornau
1640–1646 – Kaspar Karas
1662–1693 – Franz Karl Neander
1693–1703 – Johann Brunetti
1703 – Stefan Antoni Medzewski
1704–1706 – Franz Engelbert Barbo
1709–1714 – Anton Ignaz Münzer
1714–1742 – Elias Daniel Sommerfeld
1743–1760 – Franz Dominik
1761–1781 – Jan Maurycy Strachwitz
1781–1805 – Anton Ferdinand von Rothkirch und Panten
1798–1823 – Emanuel von Schimonski
1826–1830 – Karl Aulock
1831–1835 – Josef Schuberth
1838–1857 – Daniel Latussek
1857–1860 – Bernard Bogedain
1861–1875 – Adrian Włodarski
1875–1900 – Hermann Gleich
1900–1911 – Heinrich Marx
1910–1919 – Karl Augustyn
1920–1940 – Walenty Wojciech
1923–1929 – Josef Deitmer
1940–1946 – Joseph Ferche
1957–1974 – Andrzej Wronka
1961–1973 – Paweł Latusek
1967–1983 – Wincenty Urban
1973–1978 – Józef Marek
1977–1992 – Tadeusz Rybak
1978–1992 – Adam Dyczkowski
1985–2000 – Józef Pazdur
1988–2004 – Jan Tyrawa
1996–2012 – Edward Janiak
2006–2021 – Andrzej Siemieniewski
2016–present – Jacek Kiciński
2022–present – Maciej Małyga

Apostolic visitators for the expelled German priests and faithful
The expelled German priests and German Silesian faithful from the original Archdiocese of Breslau were granted the privilege of an apostolic visitator, given all diocesan jurisdiction required, by Pope Paul VI in 1972, in order to serve the Catholic Heimatvertriebene from Silesia, in West Germany, their new home. 
1972–1982 – Monsignor Hubert Thienel
1982–present – Monsignor Winfried König

Notes

Further reading
J. Jungnitz, Die Grabstätten der Breslauer Bischöfe, Breslau 1895
K. Kastner, Breslauer Bischöfe, Breslau 1929
 P. Nitecki, Biskupi kościoła w Polsce w latach 965–1999. Słownik biograficzny, Warszawa 2000.